Hobab may refer to:

 Hobab (biblical figure), Moses' father-in-law and the son of his father-in-law 
 Hobab (album), by Mohsen Yeganeh, 2012